Maurice Hart House, also known as Rock-a-way, is a historic plantation house and national historic district located near Stovall, Granville County, North Carolina.  It was built about 1845, and is a two-story, three bay, Greek Revival heavy timber frame dwelling.  It has a low hipped roof, exterior brick end chimneys, and a late-19th century porch.

It was listed on the National Register of Historic Places in 1988.

References

Plantation houses in North Carolina
Houses on the National Register of Historic Places in North Carolina
Historic districts on the National Register of Historic Places in North Carolina
Greek Revival houses in North Carolina
Houses completed in 1845
Houses in Granville County, North Carolina
National Register of Historic Places in Granville County, North Carolina